Vibia Aurelia Sabina (170 AD – before 217 AD) was the youngest daughter and child born to Roman Emperor Marcus Aurelius and Roman Empress Faustina the Younger. She was a sister to Roman Empress Lucilla and Roman Emperor Commodus. Her maternal grandparents were Roman Emperor Antoninus Pius and Roman Empress Faustina the Elder and her paternal grandparents were Domitia Lucilla and praetor Marcus Annius Verus.

Life
Aurelia Sabina could have been born in Sirmium, Pannonia. In the year of her birth, her parents were preparing war expeditions at Sirmium. Aurelia Sabina was named in honor of the late Roman Empress Vibia Sabina, who was the wife of the Roman Emperor Hadrian and her late father the distinguished suffect consul Lucius Vibius Sabinus. Vibia Sabina was a relative of Aurelia Sabina's parents, as a great aunt to Aurelia Sabina's parents, as step-sister to Rupilia Faustina. Rupilia Faustina was the paternal grandmother of Marcus Aurelius and the maternal grandmother of Faustina the Younger.

Throughout her childhood, Aurelia Sabina had travelled extensively with her parents throughout the Roman Empire. Sometime before her father died in 180 AD, Aurelia Sabina was betrothed to the African Roman Senator Lucius Antistius Burrus who came from Thibilis, a town near Hippo Regius in the Africa Province, whom she later married.

When her parents died, her older brother Commodus succeeded her father as Roman Emperor in 180 AD. After Aurelia Sabina married Antistius Burrus in Rome, they returned and settled in Thibilis. In 181 AD, her husband served as an ordinary consul there. In 188 AD, Antistius Burrus was involved in a conspiracy against Commodus.

He was one of various Roman Senators in this conspiracy.  When this conspiracy was uncovered, Antistius Burrus was put to death.

Prominent Italian resident in Roman Africa
Aurelia Sabina was not involved in the conspiracy and survived her brother's persecutions, remaining to live in Roman Africa.

After her first husband had died, Aurelia Sabina married Lucius Aurelius Agaclytus, a Romano-Greek Freedman who was of Equestrian rank. Aurelia Sabina spent her remaining years in Thibilis. It appears from her marriages that she had no children.

Due to her status; the status of her family and her connections, Aurelia Sabina became a prominent Italian resident in North Africa. According to surviving inscriptions found in Thibilis, Aurelia Sabina became an important "patrona" in Thibilis and the citizens of Thibilis made Aurelia Sabina an honorary citizen. The nearby Romano-Berber city of Calama was promoted to Roman colonia, while sponsored by Vibia Aurelia Sabina and the city honoured her as their "patrona".

References

Sources
 From Tiberius to the Antonines: a history of the Roman Empire AD 14-192, by Albino Garzetti, 1974
 The Roman Government of Britain, by Anthony R. Birley, Oxford University Press, 2005
 Marcus Aurelius, by Anthony Richard Birley, Routledge, 2000

170 births
Year of death unknown
2nd-century Roman women
Aurelii Fulvi
Vibii
Nerva–Antonine dynasty
People of Africa (Roman province)
Daughters of Roman emperors